Amy Meisak (born 18 June 1993) is a Scottish model and beauty pageant titleholder who was crowned as Miss Earth Scotland 2015 she represented Scotland at Miss Earth 2015 and placed Top 16. She also will represent Scotland at Miss Grand International 2017 on 25 October 2017 in Vietnam.

Pageantry

Miss Earth Scotland
In 2014, Amy joined the Miss Earth Scotland 2014 pageant where she was declared as Miss Earth - Water or 2nd Runner-up. After a year, Amy joined again this time, getting the crown of Miss Earth Scotland 2015 itself. The pageant took place on 29 August 2015 at the Burlington Hotel in Birmingham.

Miss Earth 2015
Amy competed at Miss Earth 2015 and placed Top 16.

Miss Grand Scotland 2017 
Amy won the title of Miss Grand Scotland in June 2017.

Miss Grand International 2017 
Amy competed at Miss Grand International in 2017 in Vietnam.

Miss Universe Great Britain 2019 
Amy competed in Miss Universe Great Britain in 2019; she placed in the top 5.

References

External links
Amy at Miss Earth UK website

1993 births
Living people
Miss Earth 2015 contestants
British beauty pageant winners
Scottish female models
Year of birth uncertain